Arangur (அரங்கூர்) is a village panchayat in Tittakudi taluk, Cuddalore district.

Location 
Arangur is located 10 km west from Tittakudi and 2 km east from NH45 near Tholudur.

References

Cuddalore district